College Swing, also known as Swing, Teacher, Swing in the U.K., is a 1938 comedy film directed by Raoul Walsh and starring George Burns, Gracie Allen, Martha Raye, and Bob Hope.  The supporting cast features Edward Everett Horton, Ben Blue, Betty Grable, Jackie Coogan, John Payne, Robert Cummings, and Jerry Colonna.

Plot
It's 1738, and Gracie Alden (Gracie Allen) of the powerful Alden family fails to graduate from the college founded by her grandfather for the ninth year in a row, so he leaves institution in his will to the first female of the family to graduate within 200 years.  At the deadline, in 1938, another Gracie Alden, the last girl of the line, is having trouble with her studies, so she hires fast-talking Bud Brady (Bob Hope) to help her.  Her efforts are opposed by woman-hating professor Hubert Dash (Edward Everett Horton) and his secretary George Jones (George Burns), who don't want to see their beloved college fall into the hands of an empty-headed nit-wit like Gracie.

When by hook and by crook Gracie manages to pass her exam and becomes the owner of the college, she does away with entrance exams, hires a bunch of incompetent but kooky teachers, and turns the place into a jumpin' jitterbugging joint complete with swing bands and remote radio broadcasts.

Cast
George Burns as George Jonas
Gracie Allen as Gracie Alden
Martha Raye as Mable
Bob Hope as Bud Brady
Edward Everett Horton as Hubert Dash
Florence George as Ginna Ashburn
Ben Blue as Ben Volt
Betty Grable as Betty
Jackie Coogan as Jackie
John Payne as Martin Bates
Cecil Cunningham as Dean Sleet
Robert Cummings as Radio Announcer
Skinnay Ennis as Skinnay
Jerry Colonna as Prof. Yascha Koloski (uncredited)
The Slate Brothers as themselves
Robert Mitchell and St. Brendan's Choristers as themselves

Cast notes:
Mary Livingstone, who became well known as the wife of Jack Benny, appears in a small uncredited part as an usherette.
Jackie Coogan and Betty Grable were married at the time they made this film together.

Production credits
 Raoul Walsh - director
 Lewis E. Gensler - producer
 Walter DeLeon - screenplay
 Francis Martin - screenplay
 Frederick Hazlitt Brennan - adaptation
 Ted Lesser - idea
 Victor Milner - photography
 Hans Dreier - art direction
 Ernst Fegté - art direction
 LeRoy Stone - editor
 Harold Lewis - sound recording
 Howard Wilson - sound recording
 Edith Head - costumes
 A. E. Freudeman - interior decorations
 LeRoy Prinz - staging dances
 Boris Morros - musical direction
 Arthur Franklin - musical adviser

Songs
"The Old School Bell" - sung by Robert Mitchell and St. Brendan's Choristers
"Moments Like This" - by Burton Lane (music) and Frank Loesser (words), performed by Florence George
"I Fall in Love with You Every Day" - by Manning Sherwin (music) and Frank Loesser (words), performed by Florence George and John Payne
"College Swing" - by Hoagy Carmichael (music) and Frank Loesser (words), sung by Betty Grable and Skinnay Ennis, danced by Betty Grable and Jackie Coogan
"How'ja Like to Love Me?" - by Burton Lane (music) and Frank Loesser (words), performed by Martha Raye and Bob Hope
"What Did Romeo Say To Juliet?" - by Burton Lane (music) and Frank Loesser (words), performed by John Payne and Florence George
"What a Rumba Does to Romance" - by Manning Sherwin (music) and Frank Loesser (lyrics), performed by Martha Raye with Ben Blue, danced by Betty Grable and Jackie Coogan, George Burns and Gracie Allen, The Slate Brothers, and unidentified extras
"You're a Natural" - by Manning Sherwin (music) and Frank Loesser (lyrics), performed by Gracie Allen
"Irish Washerwoman" - traditional Irish jig, danced by Gracie Allen
"Please" - performed by Jerry Colonna.

References

External links

1938 romantic comedy films
1938 films
American black-and-white films
American romantic comedy films
Films directed by Raoul Walsh
Films set in universities and colleges
Paramount Pictures films
1930s American films